Brian Scott Omogrosso (born April 26, 1984) is a former professional baseball pitcher.

Early life
Prior to playing professionally, he attended Blackhawk High School in Beaver Falls, Pennsylvania and then Indiana State University. He was drafted by the White Sox in the sixth round of the 2006 amateur draft.

Minor leagues

He began his professional career in 2006 with the Kannapolis Intimidators, going 1-for–2 with a 3.19 ERA in 22 relief appearances. With the Winston-Salem Warthogs in 2007, Omogrosso went 8-for-8 with a 3.74 ERA in 40 games (14 starts), striking out 108 batters in  innings. In 2008, he pitched for the Birmingham Barons, going 2-for-3 with a 3.69 ERA in 17 games (five starts). He split 2009 between the Barons and the Charlotte Knights, going a combined 7–2 with a 5.03 ERA in 17 games (13 starts). He missed most of the 2010 season while on the minor league disabled list.

Major leagues

Chicago White Sox
On June 29, 2012, Omogrosso was called up from Charlotte to replace the injured Brian Bruney. Four days later, Omogrosso made his Major league debut during a 19–2 win over the Texas Rangers. After his 5th appearance, he was optioned to make room for the return of Jesse Crain.  Omogrosso returned as a September call-up, and pitched solidly to finish the season. In 17 major league appearances, he had a 2.57 ERA and struck out 18 in 21 innings.

Omogrosso began the season with Charlotte, but was recalled on May 1 to replace Donnie Veal. After pitching 3 consecutive games, he was optioned to Charlotte on June 5, but was recalled on the June 21. He gave up 9 runs in an outing against Cleveland, and was optioned June 29. After being placed on the disabled list on July 10, he underwent season-ending elbow surgery on August 6, ending his season. He was outrighted off the roster on October 3, 2013, and elected free agency on October 6. He was re-signed in January 2014. In April 2014 he was released.

Bridgeport Bluefish
Omogrosso signed with the Bridgeport Bluefish for the 2014 season.

Retirement
Omogrosso retired on May 28, 2014.

Pitching style
Omogrosso throws five pitches, leading with a four-seam fastball at 93–96 mph. He also has a slider (mid 80s), a curveball (upper 70s), a changeup (upper 80s), and an occasional two-seam fastball. The slider is mostly used against right-handers, while the changeup is used mostly against lefties. The curve is a common two-strike pitch against hitters of both sides.

References

External links

1984 births
Living people
Baseball players from Pennsylvania
Birmingham Barons players
Bridgeport Bluefish players
Bristol White Sox players
Charlotte Knights players
Chicago White Sox players
Indiana State Sycamores baseball players
Indiana State University alumni
Kannapolis Intimidators players
Major League Baseball pitchers
People from Beaver, Pennsylvania
Tiburones de La Guaira players
American expatriate baseball players in Venezuela
Winston-Salem Warthogs players